Mary of Rome was a 1st century Christian woman mentioned in Paul the Apostle's Epistle to the Romans (16:6). She is said to have treated Paul with special kindness, and to have "laboured much among" the early Christian community.

Although it has been conjectured that she is the same person as the Mary, mother of John Mark, this is generally considered to be unproven. Most traditions hold that there is nothing more known about her.

There is also a suggestion from the Russian Orthodox tradition that Mary of Rome, is actually Mary Magdalene. Paul is not so formal as to use "of Magdalene".

Louis de Montfort - writing in his book The Secret of the Rosary - suggests that this Mary can be interpreted as the Mother of God when he writes:

Therefore let all men, the learned and the ignorant, the just
and the sinners, the great and the small praise and honor
Jesus and Mary, night and day, by saying the Most Holy
Rosary. "Salute Mary who hath labored much among you."
(Romans 16:6.)

See also
 Mary (given name), for other notable people named Mary.
 New Testament people named Mary, for other people named Mary mentioned in the New Testament.

References

People in the Pauline epistles
Women in the New Testament
Epistle to the Romans